Trioncinia is a genus of flowering plants in the sunflower family.

 Species
 Trioncinia patens A.E.Holland & D.W.Butler - Queensland 
 Trioncinia retroflexa (F.Muell.) Veldkamp - Queensland

References

Coreopsideae
Asteraceae genera
Flora of Queensland